Callionymiformes  is an order of bony fish containing two families, the dragonets Callionymidae and the Draconettidae. In some taxonomies these families make up the suborder Callionymoidei of the wider grouping known as Perciformes, Nelson (2016) recognised the order but subsequent workers have suggested that if Callionymiformes is recognised as an order then the order Syngnathiformes is rendered paraphyletic and include Callionmyoidei within that taxon.

Families
The two families placed under Callionymiformes in Nelson 2016 are:

 Callionymidae Bonaparte, 1831  (dragonets)
 Draconettidae Jordan & Fowler, 1903 (slope dragonets)

References

Percomorpha